Daniel Chamberlain  is the name of:

 Daniel Henry Chamberlain (1835–1907), 76th Governor of South Carolina
 Daniel R. Chamberlain, President of Houghton College (1976–2006)

See also
Daniel Chamberlain House